Tonje Skinnarland (born 21 December 1967) is a Norwegian major general and the current Chief of the Royal Norwegian Air Force.

In 2016, when she took over as Chief of Staff in the Air Force, she became the first female brigadier of that branch. Following the death of Major General Per-Egil Rygg in 2016, Skinnarland served temporarily in the position of General Inspector of the Air Force, before in February 2017 she was officially appointed to the position, which was now re-named as Chief of the Air Defense. She is the first woman to be the Chief of the Air Force, and the first non-pilot in the Air Force.

Skinnarland attended Forsvarets stabsskole and Forsvarets høgskole, and has been Air Wing Commander 130 Air Wing (Station Commander Air Defense Station Mågerø). From 2014 to 2016, she was aide-de-camp of the Air Force at His Majesty the King.

References

1967 births
Living people
Royal Norwegian Air Force generals
Female air force generals and air marshals